The Laughing Youth or Head of a Laughing Youth is an oil on card painting by Annibale Carracci, later applied to a canvas support. Belonging to a group of 'ritrattini' or small portraits produced by the artist from 1582 onwards, it is first mentioned in the written record as ”Buffone che ride” (The Smiling Clown) in an inventory of the Borghese collection from 1693.

References

Paintings by Annibale Carracci
16th-century portraits
Paintings in the Borghese Collection